The GS-2 was a class of streamlined 4-8-4 "Northern" type steam locomotive operated by the Southern Pacific Railroad (SP) from 1937 to 1958.  A total of six were built by the Lima Locomotive Works, numbered 4410 through 4415.  GS stands for "Golden State" or "General Service."

History
The GS-2 had a very different appearance than that of their predecessor, the GS-1. The GS-2s were streamlined and designed by Southern Pacific Company for high-speed passenger service in 1935. They featured a silver smokebox with a cone-shaped single headlight casing, skyline casing on the top of the boiler, skirting on the sides, and an air horn. They retained the teardrop classification lights and whistles of the GS-1. They had 73.5 inches drivers and could develop 4500 horsepower at 55 mph with a maximum speed of 90 mph. The tenders were rectangular and had two independent tanks: a 6010-gallon fuel oil tank, and a 22,000-gallon water tank. Access to the open cab was by two ladders attached to the front of the tender.

They were the first to receive the sliver, black, red, and orange "Daylight" paint scheme designed by Charles L. Eggleston of the Southern Pacific, and were used for the streamlined debut of Southern Pacific's premier passenger train, the Coast Daylight, in 1937. The following year they were replaced by the improved GS-3 engines. During World War II, they were painted black and silver and were used to transport troops. In the 1950s their side skirting was removed for easier maintenance, and the locomotives were assigned to general service, such as the San Jose-San Francisco Peninsula Commute service, the "Coast Mail" trains, and freight service.

Preservation
The Southern Pacific GS-2 retired in 1955. None of these locomotives have been preserved.

References

Further reading

External links 
 
 Southern Pacific Coast Daylight Engines

GS-2
4-8-4 locomotives
Lima locomotives
Streamlined steam locomotives
Passenger locomotives
Railway locomotives introduced in 1937
Steam locomotives of the United States
Scrapped locomotives
Standard gauge locomotives of the United States